The 1970 CONCACAF Champions' Cup was the 6th edition of the annual international club football competition held in the CONCACAF region (North America, Central America and the Caribbean), the CONCACAF Champions' Cup. It determined that year's club champion of association football in the CONCACAF region.

It was played from 26 April till 5 June 1970 under the home/away match system. The teams were split into 3 zones (North American, Central American and Caribbean), each one qualifying the winner to the final tournament; the semi-finals and final were scratched and Cruz Azul were declared CONCACAF Champions after Deportivo Saprissa and  SV Transvaal withdrew.

Cruz Azul from Mexico won the competition, becoming CONCACAF champion for the second time in its history.

North American Zone

 Cruz Azul won 6–0 on aggregate score.

Central American Zone

First round
Group A

{{football box collapsible
| date       = 26 April 1970
| time       = CST
| round      = 
| team1      = Atlético Marte 
| score      = 5–0
| report     = 
| team2      =  Diriangén
| goals1     = Elenilson Franco      
| goals2     = None
| location   = San Salvador, El Salvador
| stadium    = Estadio Cuscatlán
| attendance = 
| referee    = 
| nobars     = Y
}}

Group B

 Olimpia won 3–2 on aggregate score.Final Round

 Saprissa won 5–1 on aggregate score.Caribbean Zone

First round

 Transvaal won 4–1 on aggregate score. Racing Haïtien won 6–3 on aggregate score.Second round

Unknown results; Santos wins round.

Final Round

 Transvaal won 5–1 on aggregate score.''

Semi-finals 
The semi-finals and final were scratched and Cruz Azul were declared CONCACAF Champions after Deportivo Saprissa and Transvaal both withdrew.

Champion

References

1
CONCACAF Champions' Cup